Sunita Singh Chauhan is an Indian politician. She was member of the Bihar legislative assembly from Belsand vidhan sabha constituency in Sitamarhi district.

Political career 
She joined politics in 2000. She made her debut as member of legislative assembly in March 2005. But due to hung assembly election scheduled in the very same year. In Nov-Dec 2005 election she made her second consecutive win. And served as a member of the Bihar legislative assembly until 2010. In the year 2015 she again contested as a JDU candidate from Belsand vidhan sabha constituency. And made her third win by defeating her nearest rival Md. Nasir Ahmad of Lok Janshakti Party. She is criticised for taking her husband inside the vidhan sabha presidings and getting benefit as a MLA.

References 

Bihari local politicians
Women members of the Bihar Legislative Assembly
Living people
Year of birth missing (living people)
Bihar MLAs 2015–2020
Bihar MLAs 2020–2025
21st-century Indian women politicians